Saint-Élie-de-Caxton is a municipality in the Mauricie region of the province of Quebec in Canada.

Before January 15, 2005 it was known simply as Saint-Élie.

Located in the foothills of the Laurentian Mountains, its territory is dotted with lakes. The more prominent lakes are Des Souris, Goulet, and Grand Long Lakes, which are densely lined with summer cottages.

Storyteller and musician Fred Pellerin was born in Saint-Élie-de-Caxton, which is the setting of many of his published stories.

History

The Gale and Duberger Map of 1795 already identified the area as Caxton Township, named after an English village situated about 15 kilometers from Cambridge. In 1839, it was officially formed as a geographic township.

Colonization of Caxton Township was delayed because the land sold in 1833 was not yet allocated, with the owners apparently missing. In 1863, it had only 30 families. Two years later in 1865, the Parish and the Parish Municipality of Saint-Élie was formed. It got its name from Joseph-Élie-Sylvestre Sirois-Duplessis (1795–1878), parish priest of Saint-Basile-de-Madawaska (1826–1831), Saint-Stanislas-de-Champlain (1831–1846), and Saint-Barnabé-de-Saint-Maurice (1846–1865), and also one of the first priests of Saint-Élie.

In 1872, the Saint-Élie post office opened.

On December 31, 2001, Saint-Élie was transferred from the Centre-de-la-Mauricie RCM to the Maskinongé RCM, following the formation of the new City of Shawinigan and the dissolution of the Centre-de-la-Mauricie RCM. On January 15, 2005, the Parish Municipality of Saint-Élie became the Municipality of Saint-Élie-de-Caxton.

Demographics
Population trend:
 Population in 2011: 1676 (2006 to 2011 population change: 0.0%)
 Population in 2006: 1676
 Population in 2001: 1541
 Population in 1996: 1455
 Population in 1991: 1382

Private dwellings occupied by usual residents: 766 (total dwellings: 1130)

Mother tongue:
 English as first language: 3.0%
 French as first language: 95.5%
 English and French as first language: 0%
 Other as first language: 1.5%

List of mayors

The mayor is the municipality's highest elected official. Officially, mayoral elections in Saint-Élie-de-Caxton are on a non-partisan basis.

References

Incorporated places in Mauricie
Municipalities in Quebec